Lincoln Parish (French: Paroisse de Lincoln) is a parish located in the U.S. state of Louisiana. As of the 2020 census, the population was 48,396. The parish seat is Ruston. The parish was created on February 24, 1873, from parts of Bienville, Claiborne, Union, and Jackson parishes, and its boundaries have changed only once (in 1877). This makes Lincoln Parish one of the Reconstruction parishes.

Lincoln Parish comprises the Ruston, LA micropolitan statistical area.

History
Since the late 20th century, archeologists have dated eleven sites in northern Louisiana where thousands of years ago, indigenous cultures built complexes with multiple, monumental earthwork mounds during the Middle Archaic period, long before the development of sedentary, agricultural societies. At sites such as Watson Brake, Frenchman's Bend, and Caney, generations of hunter-gatherers worked for hundreds of years to build and add to mound complexes. Hedgepeth Site, located in Lincoln Parish, is dated about 5200–4500 BP (about 3300–2600 BCE), from the latter part of this period. Such finds are changing the understanding of early human cultures.

The parish was one of several new ones established by the state legislature during Reconstruction; in 1873 it was formed from land that had belonged to Bienville, Claiborne, Jackson and Union parishes to create one in which newly elected representatives might have more ties to the Republican Party. It was an attempt to break up the old order of political power, and to capitalize on the arrival of the railroad line. The parish is named for the late U.S. president Abraham Lincoln.

In 1934, the historian Robert W. Mondy of Louisiana Tech University in Ruston completed a thesis entitled "A History of Lincoln Parish, Louisiana" as part of the requirements for his Master of Arts degree from the University of Texas at Austin. Another Louisiana Tech faculty member, Robert C. Snyder, was instrumental in the establishment in 1962 of the Lincoln Parish Library. He served as the library board president for many years.

Lincoln Parish is usually Republican in contested elections. In 2012, Republican presidential nominee Mitt Romney won the parish with 10,739 votes (56.5 percent) to U.S. President Barack H. Obama, the Democrat who polled 7,956 ballots (41.9 percent).

Geography

Major highways
  Interstate 20
  U.S. Highway 80
  U.S. Highway 167
  Louisiana Highway 33

Adjacent parishes
 Union Parish  (north)
 Ouachita Parish  (east)
 Jackson Parish  (south)
 Bienville Parish  (southwest)
 Claiborne Parish  (northwest)

Communities

Cities
 Grambling
 Ruston (parish seat and largest municipality)

Towns
 Dubach
 Vienna

Villages
 Choudrant
 Downsville
 Simsboro

Unincorporated communities
 Corinth
 Mount Zion
 Pleasant Hill
 Hico
 Hilly
 Unionville

Demographics

As of the 2020 United States census, there were 48,396 people, 17,712 households, and 10,407 families residing in the parish.

Education
Lincoln Parish residents are zoned to Lincoln Parish School Board schools.

The parish is home to Louisiana Tech University in Ruston, and Grambling State University in Grambling.

Bethel Christian School is located in Ruston.

Ruston High School is located in Ruston.

Lincoln Preparatory School is located in Grambling.

Choudrant Elementary School and Choudrant High School are located in Choudrant.

National Guard
527th Engineer Battalion (Triple Alpha) ("Anything, Anytime, Anywhere") is headquartered in Ruston, Louisiana, the parish seat. This battalion is part of the 225th Engineer Brigade of the Louisiana National Guard.

Attractions
 Eddie G. Robinson Museum
 Lincoln Parish Park
 Louisiana Military Museum
 Lincoln Parish Museum
 Dixie Center for the Arts
 North Central Louisiana Arts Council
 Ruston Community Theatre
 Celebrity Theatre (movie theater)
 Annual Peach Festival held in Ruston
 Annual Chicken Festival held in Dubach
 Kingdom Collectives Film Festival held in Ruston

Politics

See also

 National Register of Historic Places listings in Lincoln Parish, Louisiana
 George M. Lomax
 Ragan Madden
 L.D. "Buddy" Napper

References

External links 
 Lincoln Parish

 
Louisiana parishes
Ruston, Louisiana micropolitan area
1873 establishments in Louisiana
Populated places established in 1873